Mjåvatnet is a lake that lies in the municipality of Vefsn in Nordland county, Norway. The European route E6 highway passes along the west coast of the lake.

See also
 List of lakes in Norway
 Geography of Norway

References

Lakes of Nordland
Vefsn